"Miss Otis Regrets" is a song about the lynching of a society woman after she murders her unfaithful lover. It was composed by Cole Porter in 1934, and first performed by Douglas Byng in Hi Diddle Diddle, a revue that opened on October 3, 1934, at London's Savoy Theatre.

Background
The song began during a party at the New York apartment of Porter's classmate from Yale, Leonard Hanna. Hearing a cowboy's lament on the radio, Porter sat down at the piano and improvised a parody of the song. He retained the referential song’s minor-keyed blues melody and added his wry take on lyrical subject matter common in country music: the regret of abandonment after being deceitfully coerced into sexual submission. Instead of a country girl, however, Miss Otis is a polite society lady.

Friend and Yale classmate Monty Woolley jumped in to help Porter "sell it", pretending to be a butler who explains why Madam can't keep a lunch appointment. In the previous 24 hours, Miss Otis was jilted and abandoned, located and killed her seducer, was arrested, jailed, and, about to be hanged by a mob, made a final, polite apology for being unable to keep her lunch appointment. This performance was so well received that the song evolved, "workshopped" with each subsequent cocktail party, many of which were at the Waldorf-Astoria suite of Elsa Maxwell, to whom Porter dedicated the song. The "smart set" that attended these parties, known to use wit or wisecracks to punctuate anecdotes and gossip, began using references to "Miss Otis" as a punchline. Porter incorporated the tale of "Miss Otis Regrets" into Hi Diddle Diddle later that year.  In Porter's 1935 show Jubilee, an alternate lyric for the song "My Most Intimate Friend" goes "and Miss Otis thinks she'll be able to attend."

Truman Capote, in his article published in the November 1975 issue of Esquire Magazine, relates a story Porter told him. Porter used "Miss Otis" as a punchline in the 1950s, opening the door to dismiss a presumptuous man from his home. Porter handed him a check as he said "Miss Otis regrets she's unable to lunch today. Now get out."

Thomas “Fats” Waller in his song Lulu's Back In Town added with the same humour the verse Mister Otis regrets, that he won't be aroun'.

Notable versions
Ethel Waters recorded a popular version of the song in New York City in 1934, released before the London debut of Hi Diddle Diddle. This was the only Porter song that Waters ever covered.
Josh White (1944)
Monty Woolley (1946, Night and Day)
Marlene Dietrich (1951) as "Mein Mann Ist Verhindert"
Ella Fitzgerald (1956)
Jose Feliciano (1969)
Ornella Vanoni (1975) as "Il mio uomo non verrà"
Richard Manuel (1986)
Bette Midler (1990)
The Pogues + Kirsty MacColl (1990, Red Hot + Blue)
Joan Morris and William Bolcom (1993, "Night and Day: The Cole Porter Album"
Bryan Ferry (1999)
Patti Austin (2002) "For Ella"
Linda Ronstadt (2004)
Van Morrison and Joey DeFrancesco (2018, You're Driving Me Crazy)

References

External links
 "To Bricktop on her Belated Birthday" 
 This song by Edith Piaf - 1946
 Uptempo version by Meschiya Lake & the Little Big Horns - 2013. YouTube
 Kirsty MacColl & The Band of the Irish Guards, 1995. YouTube

Songs written by Cole Porter
1934 songs
Nancy Wilson (jazz singer) songs
Kirsty MacColl songs
Bette Midler songs
Black comedy music
Murder ballads
Songs about death
Songs about crime